Daniel Delloro Larze (born October 12, 2005), also known as Daníel or simply Danny or Dan, is a Puerto Rican singer, musician, songwriter and writer.

Daniel is an Puerto Rican Singer at age 6 discovered by Puerto Rican Producer year 2009 and used to be the vocal lead of MDO Kids.

Daniel known for his song Por Favor Trátame Bien, Sin Ti

See also 

List of Puerto Ricans

References

External links